"I Love This Game" is New York production group AT's first single from their third album, which features the Spanish pop singer Natalia. The video features the lead singer Lexter and Natalia playing basketball in a New York barrio. The song also appears on the Spanish compilation album Disco Estrella, and is  Natalia's debut UK single. The song was written by William Luque, Lexter and Natalia.

Chart performance

2005 singles
2005 songs